Jennifer Joyce Kesse (born May 20, 1981) is an American woman from Orlando, Florida, who has been missing since January 23, 2006. Shortly after she vanished, Kesse's car was discovered parked around a mile from her home. Security footage recorded a person parking Kesse's car and walking away; the person could not be identified due to poor camera quality and the absence of any visible distinguishing physical features. The case received local and national press attention. 

As of 2023, no arrests have been made and Kesse's whereabouts remain unknown.

Prior events 
A graduate of Vivian Gaither High School in Tampa, Florida, Kesse attended the University of Central Florida in Orlando and graduated in 2003 with a degree in finance. At the time she disappeared, she was working as a finance manager at Central Florida Investments Timeshare Company in Ocoee and had recently bought a condominium in Orlando. The weekend before she vanished, Kesse  vacationed with her boyfriend on Saint Croix, U.S. Virgin Islands. After returning on Sunday, she spent that night at her boyfriend's home, then drove straight to work on the morning of Monday, January 23, 2006.

Disappearance 
Kesse was seen for the last time leaving work at approximately 6:00 pm on January 23, 2006. She spoke by phone with her father while driving home at around 6:15 pm, and then with her boyfriend at around 10:00 pm. She was in the habit of texting or telephoning her boyfriend before leaving for work, so it was unusual when she did neither the next morning. His call to her went to voicemail.

When Kesse failed to arrive at work, her employer contacted her parents, who set out on the two-hour drive from their home to hers. Kesse's parents noticed that her car was missing but saw nothing out of the ordinary in her home. A wet towel and clothes laid out, among other things, suggested that she had showered, dressed, and prepared for work that morning. Friends and family distributed fliers about Kesse that evening, and the Orlando Police Department organized search parties on foot and on horseback, as well as by boat, helicopter, car, and ATV.

Timeline
Times are approximate and based on witness statements:

Monday, January 23, 2006
 6:00 p.m. Kesse leaves work and calls her parents. This is the last time her family hears from her. She arrives home for the first time since having left for vacation.
 10:00 p.m. Kesse and her boyfriend talk by phone and say their goodnights. He is the last known person to speak with her before her disappearance.

Tuesday, January 24, 2006
 7:30 a.m. – 8:00 a.m. Investigators initially believed that Kesse was abducted as she was walking from her front door to her car. They now believe that she left, and was abducted at some point on her way to work. 
 8:00 a.m. – 9:00 a.m. Kesse's boyfriendwhom she would normally call but did notcalls her on the way to work but it goes directly to voicemail. He chalks it up to a meeting she had mentioned to him. His subsequent attempts are likewise unsuccessful. Kesse's parents call him to say that she failed to show up at work.
 11:00 a.m. Alarmed at Kesse's uncharacteristic no call, no show, her employer contacts her parents, who begin the drive from Tampa to Orlando. On the way, they call to ask the manager of her condominium to check her home with a spare key. He reports that everything appears normal inside and that her car is missing outside.
 12:00 p.m. Only  from Kesse's home, surveillance cameras at an apartment complex record a person parking her car and walking away. The car and footage are not discovered until two days later.
 3:00 p.m – 3.15 p.m. Kesse's parents and brother arrive at her apartment. They find evidence that she had been home that morning. They call the police. As Kesse is an adult, police initially hold that she may have left of her own volition.
 5:00 p.m. – 7:00 p.m. Family and friends saturate the area with fliers that show Kesse's picture. The police send a detective to her home and begin interrogations and searches.

Thursday, January 26, 2006
 8:10 a.m. Seeing Kesse's car on the news, a tenant of a nearby complex informs the police that it has sat abandoned in front of their apartment for several days. Police confirm that it is Kesse's 2004 Chevy Malibu. The vehicle is photographed and taken for forensic examination. Police examine local surveillance footage and discover an unidentified person parking her car and walking away.

Investigation 

With no sign of forced entry or a struggle, investigators initially theorized that on the morning of January 24 Kesse left her apartment for work and locked her front door, only to be abducted at some point while walking toward or getting into her car. On January 26, around 8:10 a.m., her black 2004 Chevrolet Malibu was found parked at another apartment complex about a mile from her own. Investigators were excited to learn that several hidden cameras at the apartments surveilled the part of the lot where the car had been parked as well as the exit. 

The surveillance footage showed an unidentified "person of interest" dropping Kesse's vehicle off at approximately noon the day she went missing. None of her family or friends recognized the person, whose physical features were not clear on the video. Investigators were disheartened to find that the best video capture of this subject, in three separate snapshots, was obscured by the complex fencing, the posts aligning to conceal the face. One journalist called the suspect "The luckiest person of interest ever". The FBI was called in to help determine the person's size and gender, but could only say that the person stood between 5'3" and 5'5". NASA also enhanced the video to help identify the suspect. 

Detectives interpreted the valuables left inside the car to imply that robbery was not a motive in the case. A search dog tracked a scent that led from her parked car back to her apartment complex, prompting detectives to believe that the suspect might have returned to her apartment's parking lot after abandoning the car. No other evidence was found along the route. A forensic examination of the car yielded little in the way of evidence, only a latent print and a small DNA fiber. Investigators deduced that the car had been wiped down. The following items are known to be missing: her cell phone, her iPod, her keys, her purse, her briefcase, and the outfit she was wearing. Authorities were unable to ping her cellphone, its power remaining off. Her bank account keycard has not been used since her disappearance.

As is customary, investigators first questioned Kesse's immediate family and close friends, to see if any of them could have had a motive to abduct her. Her ex-boyfriend, recently upset and wishing to get back together with her, was also interrogated, but it was concluded that he had nothing to do with her abduction. Her current boyfriend was also questioned but his alibi checked out, eliminating him as a suspect. At the time of her disappearance, Kesse's condominium complex had been undergoing a major expansion, and many of the laborers on site were non-English speaking. 

Kesse told family members on several occasions that the construction workers constantly catcalled, whistled at, and harassed her. Due to the language barrier, investigators were unable to interrogate many of them. No other leads regarding them were discovered. Detectives then turned their focus to her place of employment and began questioning her coworkers. Her computer was taken for forensic examination, which revealed that a manager where she worked desired a relationship with her, but that she had refused his advances because she opposed workplace relationships. Detectives interviewed this manager multiple times but ultimately ruled him out as a suspect. Investigators and Kesse's friends and family remain open to the theory that she fell victim to human trafficking but consider it less likely than others. 
 
In May 2007, Kesse's company, led by David A. Siegel, offered a $1 million reward for information leading to her whereabouts, with a July 4 deadline and the stipulation that she had to be alive. It was never claimed. A $5,000 reward for information leading to the whereabouts of her remains was available through Central Florida Crimeline. The case received state and national press attention at the time of her disappearance. On May 2, 2008, the Florida House of Representatives unanimously passed Senate Bill 502, "The Jennifer Kesse and Tiffany Sessions Missing Persons Act", to reform how missing-persons cases are handled in Florida. 

As of June 10, 2010, the FBI has taken the case over from the Orlando Police Department; it did so at the urging of police chief Val Demings. The latest search for her took place in February 2014, and investigators continue to receive and pursue leads.

In 2018, Kesse's parents filed suit against the Orlando Police Department to gain access to police records on the case. The lawsuit was settled in March of 2019, allowing the family access to 16,000 pages of records.

In December 2022, it was reported that the investigation into Kesse's disappearance had been turned over to the Florida Department of Law Enforcement (FDLE) cold case unit. The FDLE intends to interview people Kesse's law enforcement team has already identified as possible suspects or people who may have valuable information, and to retest evidence that Kesse's family says has never been retested.

Kesse is still considered missing and endangered by the Orlando Police Department,  FBI, Orange County Sheriff's Office, FDLE,  NCIC, NCMA, and Interpol. Kesse also remains on the FBI's Most Wanted/Missing List.

In media 
In 2020, Fox News Investigates released a podcast on Kesse's disappearance, House of Broken Dreams: The Jennifer Kesse Story.

See also 

 Cold case (an unsolved criminal case)
 List of people who disappeared mysteriously: 1990–present

References

External links
Website put together by Friends and Family
Jennifer Kesse Missing Persons Profile on "FBI.gov"
Jennifer Kesse Missing Persons Profile on Interpol
CBS News article – Stolen Beauty
CBS News 48 Hours Mystery video – Stolen Beauty

1981 births
2000s missing person cases
2006 in Florida
January 2006 events in the United States
Missing person cases in Florida
People from Orlando, Florida
People from Tampa, Florida
University of Central Florida alumni
Possibly living people
History of women in Florida